Gordon Parker may refer to:

 Gordon Parker (psychiatrist), Australian professor of psychiatry
 Gordon Parker (author) (born 1940), British novelist and playwright
 Gordon R. Parker, business executive